Lizzie Loudon is a British political adviser. She served as press secretary to Theresa May, before resigning in April 2017.

Loudon is a former employee of the Vote Leave campaign, adviser to Iain Duncan Smith and civil servant. In February 2017, she was described by The Spectator as "No 10's secret weapon".

References

External links
 Twitter page
 Index of meetings

Living people
British political consultants
Conservative Party (UK) people
British special advisers
Year of birth missing (living people)